Group A of the 1994 Federation Cup Europe/Africa Zone was one of eight pools in the Europe/Africa zone of the 1994 Federation Cup. Three teams competed in a round robin competition, with the top two teams qualifying for the knockout stage.

Belgium vs. Turkey

Turkey vs. Estonia

Belgium vs. Estonia

See also
Fed Cup structure

References

External links
 Fed Cup website

1994 Federation Cup Europe/Africa Zone